Comparative Studies in Society and History is a peer-reviewed academic journal published quarterly by Cambridge University Press on behalf of the Society for Comparative Study of Society and History. It was established in 1958.

References

External links

Journal online

History journals
Publications established in 1958
Quarterly journals
English-language journals
Cambridge University Press academic journals
Academic journals associated with learned and professional societies